Mexcala vicina is a jumping spider species in the genus Mexcala that lives in Cameroon. The male was described by Wanda Wesołowska in 2009. The species is named after the Latin word for neighbour, referring to the relationship between this species and others in the genus.

References

Endemic fauna of Cameroon
Salticidae
Arthropods of Cameroon
Spiders of Africa
Spiders described in 2009
Taxa named by Wanda Wesołowska